Taggafadi  is a human settlement in the Arlit Department of the Agadez Region of northern-central Niger.

External links
Satellite map at Maplandia

References

Taggafadi, Niger Page. Falling Rain Genomics, Inc. 1996–2004.

Populated places in Niger
Agadez Region